Dawson Trail is a provincial electoral division in the Canadian province of Manitoba. It was created by redistribution in 2008, out of parts of Morris and La Verendrye.

Communities in the riding include Ste. Anne, Île-des-Chênes, Lorette, Ste-Geneviève, Landmark, Richer, and St. Adolphe. The riding's population in 2006 was 19,530.

List of provincial representatives

Electoral results

2011 general election

2016 general election

2019 general election

References

Dawson Trail